Arthur Cox may refer to:

Arthur Cox (actor) (1934–2021), British actor
Arthur Cox (American football) (born 1961), former American football tight end
Arthur Cox (English cricketer) (1907–1986), English cricketer
Arthur Cox (footballer) (born 1939), English footballer and football manager
Arthur Cox (lawyer) (1891–1965), Irish lawyer and politician
Arthur Cox (law firm), established by the Irish lawyer 
Arthur Cox (New Zealand cricketer) (1904–1977), New Zealand cricketer
Arthur Cox (ornithologist) (1870–1947), English ornithologist
Arthur Button (cricketer) (1815–1870), cricketer who later changed his name to Cox

See also
Arthur Cleveland Coxe (1818–1896), second Episcopalian bishop of New York
Arthur Cocks (disambiguation)
3961 Arthurcox, minor planet